The 2009 Vuelta a España was the 64th Vuelta a España. The event took place from 29 August to 20 September 2009. For only the second time in the race's history, it began away from Spanish soil, with the race not in fact reaching Spain until Stage 5.

The 2009 Vuelta has been described as having an easy start and a hard finish. This is because of the short individual time trial and three perfectly flat stages in the Netherlands, Germany and Belgium (along with another in Spain in the race's first week), and eight of the final fourteen stages being mountain stages, with four mountaintop finishes.

The race was won by Spain's Alejandro Valverde who claimed his first grand tour victory.

Teams

29 teams sought places in the race, of which 21 were initially invited to compete. , one of two UCI ProTour teams omitted from the list of invited teams, appealed to the Court of Arbitration for Sport and were subsequently granted the right to enter.  are thus the only ProTour team absent from the race.

Stages

For details see 2009 Vuelta a España, Stage 1 to Stage 11 and 2009 Vuelta a España, Stage 12 to Stage 21.

Classification leadership
In the 2009 Vuelta a España, four different jerseys are awarded. For the general classification, calculated by adding the finishing times of the stages per cyclist after deduction of time bonuses for high placings in stage finishes and at intermediate sprints, the leader receives a golden jersey. This classification is considered the most important of the Vuelta a España, and the winner of the general classification is considered the winner of the Vuelta.

Additionally, there is also a points classification, which awards a green jersey. In the points classification, cyclists receive points for finishing in the top 15 in a stage. The winner gets 25 points, second place 20, third 16, fourth 14, fifth 12, sixth 10, and one point per place less down the line, to a single point for fifteenth. In addition, some points can be won in intermediate sprints.

There is also a mountains classification, which awards a red jersey. In the mountains classifications, points were won by reaching the top of a mountain before other cyclists. Each climb is categorized, with most of the climbs being either first, second, third, or fourth category. There are also three "special category" climbs (equivalent to hors catégorie in the Tour de France); these are the stage finishes on the Alto de Aitana, the Alto de Sierra Nevada, and the Sierra de La Pandera. These climbs award even more points than a first-category climb.

Finally, there is the combination classification. This is calculated by adding the rankings in the general, points and mountains classifications; the cyclist with the lowest combined ranking is the leader in the combination classification, and receives a white jersey.

There is also a classification for teams. In this classification, the times of the best three cyclists per stage are added, and the team with the lowest time is the leader.

Jersey wearers when one rider is leading two or more competitions
If a cyclist leads two or more competitions at the end of a stage, he receives all those jerseys. In the next stage, he can only wear one jersey, and he wears the jersey representing leadership in the most important competition (golden first, then green, then granate, then white). The other jerseys that the cyclists owns are worn in the next stage by the second-place (or, if needed, third or fourth-place) rider in that classification.
 In Stage 2, Tom Boonen wore the green jersey, and Tyler Farrar wore the white jersey
 In Stage 3, Gerald Ciolek wore the white jersey
 In Stage 4, Greg Henderson wore the white jersey
 In Stages 6 & 7, Tom Boonen wore the green jersey
 In Stage 9, Damiano Cunego wore the white jersey
 In Stage 13, Cadel Evans wore the white jersey
 In Stages 14–19, Robert Gesink wore the white jersey
 In Stage 15 & 16, André Greipel wore the green jersey
 In Stage 20, Ezequiel Mosquera wore the white jersey
 In Stage 21, Samuel Sánchez wore the white jersey

Final standings
After stage 21

General Classification

Points Classification

King of the Mountains Classification

Combination Classification

Teams Classification

World Rankings points
The Vuelta was the penultimate event in the 2009 UCI World Ranking.  The rankings leader, Alberto Contador, did not compete in the event, but five of the top ten did, including the race winner, Valverde, who earned enough points to ensure that the title was not yet decided.  Valverde, however, remained banned from riding in Italy, and so did not take part in the final ranking event, the 2009 Giro di Lombardia.

Vuelta

References

External links

cyclingnews.com

 
2009
1
2009 in Belgian sport
2009 in Dutch sport
2009 UCI World Ranking